The Petersburg Creek–Duncan Salt Chuck Wilderness is a designated wilderness area located on Kupreanof Island, Alaska, within the Tongass National Forest. Created in 1980 by the Alaska National Interest Lands Conservation Act, the wilderness area protects 46,849 acres of temperate rainforests, salt marsheses and rugged, glacier-carved mountains.

References

ANILCA establishments
IUCN Category Ib
Protected areas of Petersburg Borough, Alaska
Wilderness areas of the Tongass National Forest